The Dartry Mountains are a mountain range in the north west of Ireland, in the north of counties Sligo and Leitrim. They lie between Lough Melvin, Lough Gill and Lough MacNean.

The mountains are named after the old túath of Dartraighe, which was part of the kingdom of Bréifne. The mountains are very close to the Breifne Mountains, which lie to the southeast.

The range is a large dissected limestone plateau. Glaciation has carved the distinctive shapes of this mountain range. The range includes the valleys of Glencar, Glenade and Gleniff.

Highest peaks

Gallery

References

Mountains and hills of County Sligo
Mountains and hills of County Leitrim